Wayside may refer to:
 Wayobjects, trackside objects
Wayside (band), an early version of As Friends Rust
Wayside (TV series), a television show based on the children's book Sideways Stories from Wayside School
A rest area

Places 
United States
Wayside, Georgia
Wayside, Kansas
Wayside, Mississippi
Wayside, New Jersey
The Wayside, Concord, Massachusetts
 In Texas:
Wayside, Lynn County, Texas
Wayside, Roberts County, Texas
Wayside, Armstrong County, Texas
Wayside, West Virginia
Wayside, Wisconsin

See also
Sideways (disambiguation)